Dasrangiin Myagmar (born 1949) is a Mongolian wrestler. He competed in the men's Greco-Roman 82 kg at the 1972 Summer Olympics.

References

External links
 

1949 births
Living people
Mongolian male sport wrestlers
Olympic wrestlers of Mongolia
Wrestlers at the 1972 Summer Olympics
People from Khovd Province